The Dingle Way is a long-distance trail around the Dingle Peninsula in County Kerry, Ireland. It is designated as a National Waymarked Trail by the National Trails Office of the Irish Sports Council and is managed by the Dingle Way Committee and Kerry County Council.

Route
The trail begins in Tralee, following the towpath of the Tralee Ship Canal to Blennerville, after which it follows the road for a while before climbing up to a mountain track along the northern flanks of the Slieve Mish Mountains. From here it descends towards Tralee Bay and the village of Camp. The next few stages – Camp to Annascaul, via Inch Strand; Annascaul to Dingle, via Lispole; and Dingle to Dunquin, via Ventry – mainly follow minor roads and boreens. The latter section of the stage between Dingle and Dunquin follows a cliff path around Slea Head. The section between Dunquin and Ballycurrane follows a mixture of roads, beaches and cliff paths. The most mountainous stretch of the Way now follows as the trail ascends a saddle between Brandon and Masatiompan mountains. At , this is the highest point reached by any of the National Waymarked Trails in Ireland. The Way then descends to Brandon village and follows a trail to the village of Cloghane. From Cloghane, the trail follows Fermoyle Strand, Ireland's longest beach, to Fahamore, before following roads to the village of Castlegregory. The final stage follows the coastline to Camp before retracing the outward route to Tralee.

Usage
A review of the National Waymarked Trails in 2010 found both multi-day and day usage of the Dingle Way to be high and recommended that work should commence to upgrade it to a National Long Distance Trail, a proposed new standard of trail in Ireland intended to meet international standards for outstanding trails. It also recommended that the development of looped walks off the main route should be considered.

References

Notes

Bibliography

External links
 dingleway.ie
 dingleway.com

Long-distance trails in the Republic of Ireland
Geography of County Kerry
Tourist attractions in County Kerry